Dominique Ropion (born 1955) is a French master perfumer. Born in Paris, he trained at Roure Bertrand Dupont (now Givaudan perfumery school) in Grasse. After joining International Flavors & Fragrances Inc. in 2000, Ropion has worked for fragrance brands including Christian Dior, Thierry Mugler, Lancôme, Givenchy, Frédéric Malle, Issey Miyake, Yves Saint Laurent, Paco Rabanne and The Body Shop.

Awards and recognition 
Ropion has received Cosmetique Magazine Oscar (2010), the Chevalier de l’Ordre des Arts et des Lettres (2012), the Cosmetic Valley's International Fragrance Prize or Prix François Coty (2008). He received the title of Master Perfumer in 2018.

List of creations 

 Yardley London Lace (1982)
 Givenchy Ysatis (1984)
 Givenchy Amarige (1991)
 Kenzo Jungle Elephant (1996)
 Calvin Klein Euphoria
 Thierry Mugler Alien
 Frédéric Malle Vétiver Extraordinaire (2002)
 Cacharel Amor Amor (2003)
 Viktor & Rolf Flowerbomb (2004)
 Frédéric Malle Carnal Flower (2005)
 Frédéric Malle Geranium pour Monsieur (2009)
 Yves Saint Laurent La Nuit de L'Homme (2009)
 Frédéric Malle Portrait of a Lady (2010)
 Lancôme La Vie Est Belle (2012)
 Frédéric Malle Cologne Indelebile (2015)
 Elie Saab Girl of Now Forever (2019)
 Régime des Fleurs Al-Dukhan

References 

1955 births
Living people
French perfumers
Chevaliers of the Ordre des Arts et des Lettres
Businesspeople from Paris